Pseudocaryopteris is a genus of plants first described in 1999. It is native to China, Thailand, Myanmar, and the Himalayas (from Pakistan to Assam).

Species
Species below are those accepted by the World Checklist. Names used by Flora of China are in parentheses

 Pseudocaryopteris bicolor (Roxb. ex Hardw.) P.D.Cantino - (Caryopteris bicolor (Roxb. ex Hardw.) Mabb.) - China, Pakistan, northern + eastern India, Nepal, Bangladesh, Bhuran, Arunachal Pradesh, Thailand
 Pseudocaryopteris foetida (D.Don) P.D.Cantino - Pakistan, northern India, Nepal
 Pseudocaryopteris paniculata (C.B.Clarke) P.D.Cantino - (Caryopteris paniculata C.B.Clarke) - China, Pakistan, northern + eastern India, Nepal, Bangladesh, Bhuran, Arunachal Pradesh, Thailand, Myanmar

References

Lamiaceae
Lamiaceae genera